Bakin Pertin (1 May 1942, in Damro village – 5 January 1996, in Guwahati) was an Indian politician. Pertin belonged to the Adi people. He was one of the first elected Lok Sabha members of Arunachal Pradesh, and later became a Member of the Legislative Assembly of that state.

Youth and early career
Pertin studied at St. Edmund's College in Shillong and Delhi College in Delhi. Pertin began his political activism during his student years. In 1959 the All NEFA Students Union (later renamed as the All Arunachal Pradesh Students' Union) was founded, with Pertin as its general secretary. He worked at the news division of All India Radio between 1964 and 1969. He was a member of Damro I Gram Panchayat, Maryiang Anchal Samiti and Siang Zilla Parishad. In 1974 he became the general secretary of the Bogum Bokang Kebang (the highest tribal authority of the Adi people). In 1975 he became the vice-president of the Siang Zilla Parishad. He is also the founder president of PPA( peoples party of Arunachal). Indira Gandhi, the then prime minister had invited him to join Congress by offering him with Chief Minister's post, but he denied.

1977 election
The 1977 general election was the first time the newly created Union Territory of Arunachal Pradesh was able to elect two members of the Lok Sabha (lower house of the Indian parliament). Pertin contested the election as an independent candidate for the Arunachal East constituency. He won the seat, obtaining 28,557 votes (56.34% of the votes in the constituency). The election in Arunachal Pradesh was fought on religious lines, as the two independent candidates (Pertin and another, that eventually withdrew from contest) were Christians and the two Indian National Congress candidate practised indigenous Donyi-Polo religion.

MP
After being elected to the Lok Sabha, Pertin resigned from his post as Zilla Parishad vice-president. In his election manifesto, Pertin had vowed to form a regional political party, if elected. Following the election Pertin organised a meeting in Pasighat in April 1977, to found the People's Party of Arunachal. Pertin became the president of the new party. Whilst being the leader of PPA, Pertin was continued to be linked to the Janata Party (then in government) in Delhi. Pertin had the status of being an 'associated' member of the Janata Party. He later broke his links with the Janata Party. He joined Member of the Congress Parliamantry Party  Pertin strongly opposed the Freedom of Indigenous Faith Bill (which outlaws conversion from 'one indigenous faith to any other faith or religion by use of force or by inducement or by fraudulent means').

1980 election
He lost the Arunachal East Lok Sabha seat in the 1980 general election. He obtained 43% of the votes. In the election campaign Pertin's opponents had accused PPA of being a Christian party and opposed to indigenous religion.

MLA
He tried to win back the Arunachal East Lok Sabha seat in the 1984 election. He finished in second place with 22,697 votes (23.76%). Pertin also contested the 1984 Arunachal Pradesh Legislative Assembly election, as the PPA candidate in the Meriyang-Mebo constituency. He won the seat with 4,167 votes (51.42%).

In Janata Dal
Baking Pertin was opposed to the merger of People Party of Arunachal Pradesh to Janata Dal. He cried in the meeting held at the State Guest House, Naharlagun. Despite his objection the PPA was merged to Janata Dal in fear of Apang Congress merging with the Janta Dal Party. In this merger meeting Tomo Riba was made the President of Janata Dal Party in Arunachal Pradesh. It is pertinent to mention Railway Minister George Fernandes advised both Bakin and Tomo not to join Janata Dal Party. General Secretaries which included Dagmojini, Jarbom Gamlin and most of the senior leaders of PPA wanted to merge with the Janata Dal of VP Singh. The split seems inevitable if Bakin did not agree to the merger. He contested two seats in the Arunachal Pradesh Legislative Assembly election, 1990|1990 Legislative Assembly election; Mariyang-Geku (ST) and Pasighat East (ST). He lost in both constituencies. Pertin obtained 2,746 votes (34.48%) in  Pasighat East (ST), losing by a margin of merely 84 votes). In Mariyang-Geku he finished second with 3,047 votes (44.91%). In the 1995 Legislative Assembly election he contested the Mebo (ST) seat, again as a Janata Dal candidate. He finished in second place with 1,872 votes (32.47%).

Pertin died in 1996, at the age of 53. He was noted for his remark against Apang government as "Land of Khusiq-Khusi." contributions to parliamentary will be a historical.

References

1996 deaths
1942 births
Arunachal Pradesh MLAs 1984–1990
India MPs 1977–1979
Lok Sabha members from Arunachal Pradesh
People from Pasighat
Indian Christians
Arunachal Pradesh district councillors
People from East Siang district
People's Party of Arunachal politicians
Janata Dal politicians